Peachtree Center is a district located in Downtown Atlanta, Georgia. Most of the structures that make up the district were designed by Atlanta architect John C. Portman, Jr. A defining feature of the Peachtree Center is a network of enclosed pedestrian sky bridges suspended above the street-level, which have garnered criticism for discouraging pedestrian street life. The district is served by the Peachtree Center MARTA station, providing access to rapid transit.

History

Intended to be the new downtown for Atlanta, Peachtree Center emerged as a distinct district in the early 1970s as a networked realm of convention hotels, shopping galleries, and office buildings a quarter-mile north of Five Points. Peachtree Center is notable for its uniform embodiment of the modern architectural style popular at the time. Yet the defining feature of Peachtree Center is its insular orientation, which allows patrons and workers to avoid interacting with the street level by traversing the area through sky bridges. By the mid-1980s, Peachtree Center had become the core of a dedicated hotel-convention district that lay at the heart of the Downtown economy, even as the remainder of Downtown Atlanta deteriorated markedly.

While at the time Peachtree Center was considered the salvation of a decaying downtown Atlanta, contemporary city planning is highly critical of such insular environments that "turn their back" on the city streets. Thus, as intown Atlanta began its post-1990 resurgence, Peachtree Center was increasingly criticized as an area that epitomized contemporary Atlanta's generic urbanity and sense of placelessness. Other critics claim that Peachtree Center is disorienting, killed downtown street-life, and disregarded the existing urban context.

The center was recognized for its architecture with listing on the National Register of Historic Places in 2018.

Architecture

Economy
The U.S. Census Bureau has its Atlanta Regional Census Center in Suite 1000 in the Marquis Two Tower.  Several additional U.S. Government agencies have their southeast regional offices located in the Harris Tower, including the Department of Transportation, Department of Labor, Small Business Administration, and Internal Revenue Service.

The Consulate-General of Argentina is located in Suite 2101 in the Marquis One Tower. The Consulate-General of Germany is located in Suite 901 of the Marquis Two Tower. The Consulate-General of South Korea is located in Suite 500 in the International Tower.

Gallery

See also
 Embarcadero Center, San Francisco
Rockefeller Center, New York

References

External links

  Peachtree Center official website

Neighborhoods in Atlanta
Shopping malls in the Atlanta metropolitan area
John C. Portman Jr. buildings
Twin towers
National Register of Historic Places in Fulton County, Georgia